Sechin may refer to:
Sechin (surname)
 Séchin, a commune in France
 Cerro Sechin, an archaeological site in Peru
 Sechin Alto, an archaeological site in Peru
 Sechin Bajo, an archaeological site in Peru
 Sechín River in Peru